Benzestrol (brand names Chemestrogen, Ocestrol, Octestrol, Octoestrol, Octofollin) is a synthetic nonsteroidal estrogen of the stilbestrol group which was formerly used medically but has since been discontinued. The stilbestrol estrogens, the best-known of which is diethylstilbestrol (DES) were used extensively in the mid-1900s and were finally banned by the FDA due to them causing tumors in the children of women who used them.

Medical uses
Benzestrol and other stilbestrol were used as synthetic estrogens in order to prevent premature births. Based on the idea that premature births happened because the mother did not produce enough estrogen on her own, doctors prescribed benzestrol to mothers in order to increase their estrogen levels.

Studies have been done in the past on normal, mature and castrate female rats. Benzestrol produced the same type of estrus in the castrate rat when injected at 0.8 to 1.0 micrograms as when the rat was injected with 2.0 to 2.5 micrograms of estrone. This is significant because less benzestrol could be used to produce the same effect as estrone in increasing estrogen production. It has been used in the past as a nonsteroidal estrogen antagonist.

Pharmacology

Pharmacodynamics
Benzestrol is described as a very potent estrogen. It is reported to have about 130% of the relative binding affinity of estradiol for the estrogen receptors.

Chemistry
Benzestrol is usually grouped with the stilbestrol estrogens. However, benzestrol is technically not a stilbestrol derivative because its central chain is elongated by one carbon. In any case, it is a very close analogue of the stilbestrol estrogens.

History
Benzestrol is a drug in the stilbestrol family of estrogens. These drugs were first produced in the late 1930s. Benzestrol itself was reported in 1946. In 1953, experiments began on benzestrol and other stilbestrols to see if they actually helped stop premature births. This study in 1953 found that benzestrol did not in fact help stop premature births. A study in 1971 found that benzestrol was the cause of a rare vaginal cancer in girls and women whose mothers had been on benzestrol while pregnant.

See also
 Dienestrol
 Hexestrol
 Methestrol

References

Abandoned drugs
Drugs acting on the blood and blood forming organs
Phenols
Stilbenoids
Synthetic estrogens